The rufous-rumped antwren (Euchrepomis callinota) is a species of bird in the family Thamnophilidae. It is found in Colombia, Costa Rica, Ecuador, Guyana, Panama, Peru, Suriname, and Venezuela. Its natural habitat is subtropical or tropical moist montanes.

The rufous-rumped antwren was described by the English zoologist Philip Sclater in 1855 and given the binomial name Formicivora nigrocinereus. The current genus Euchrepomis was introduced in 2012.

References

rufous-rumped antwren
Birds of Costa Rica
Birds of Panama
Birds of the Northern Andes
Birds of the Guianas
rufous-rumped antwren
rufous-rumped antwren
Taxonomy articles created by Polbot